"Save the Children" is a 1971 song written by Al Cleveland, Renaldo Benson and Marvin Gaye and issued on Marvin's 1971 album, What's Going On. While not issued as a single in the United States, the song was issued as a single by the Tamla-Motown label in the United Kingdom where it peaked at No. 41 on the charts in December 1971, whereas the other major US single releases initially failed to chart in Europe.

The song would later be covered by Diana Ross in a medley featuring the jazz song, "Brown Baby", on her 1973 album, Touch Me in the Morning. Gaye sang this song briefly while touring Europe in 1976 as part of his What's Going On medley.

Lyrics
The song was a continuation of the message "What's Going On" delivered, about love, this time, for the children. Marvin later joked on the liner notes of the album "not let (this song) influence anyone". Marvin recorded both a spoken word recitation of the song and a vocal version mixing the two vocals together featuring Marvin's soft-spoken vocals on one side and his expressive tenor on the other.

Personnel
Marvin Gaye – lead vocals, spoken verses, production
The Andantes – background vocals
The Funk Brothers – instrumentation

References

1971 songs
Marvin Gaye songs
Songs about children
Songs written by Marvin Gaye
Songs written by Al Cleveland
Songs written by Renaldo Benson
Song recordings produced by Marvin Gaye
1971 singles
Diana Ross songs
Tamla Records singles